Jung Hyeon-jun (born November 8, 2011), is a South Korean child actor. He is best known internationally for his role as Park Da-song in the Academy Award-winning film Parasite.

Filmography

Film

Television series

Awards and nominations

References

External links
 Jung Hyeon-jun T1 Entertainment Official Website
 
 

2011 births
Living people
South Korean male television actors
South Korean male film actors
South Korean male child actors
Outstanding Performance by a Cast in a Motion Picture Screen Actors Guild Award winners